Frederikshavn is a Danish town in Frederikshavn municipality, Region Nordjylland, on the northeast coast of the Jutland peninsula in northern Denmark.  Its name translates to "Frederik's harbor". It was originally named Fladstrand.

The town has a population of 22,672 (1 January 2022), and is an important traffic portal with its ferry connections to Gothenburg in Sweden. The town is well known for fishing and its fishing and industrial harbours.

Frederikshavn's oldest building, Fiskerklyngen, is originally from the mid-16th century, but the houses now there are from 18th–19th centuries.

History
Frederikshavn was originally called Fladstrand (lit. "Flat beach") from its location in Flade parish.

Fladstrand
The first mention of a settlement is in a letter dated 13 March 1572 found in the Danish chancery letterbooks. It was a fishing village, trading place and crossing point to Norway.

The old Fladstrand church was built between 1686 and 1690. On 31 December 1700 a tax of 500 rigsdaler was put on the town which indicates a fair amount of trade.

During the Great Nordic War from 1700 to 1721 the town saw a rise in activity as travellers to Norway embarked from here as the route over Sweden was cut. The activity slowly subsided after the war.

A royal maritime pilot was stationed at the town from 1733 after King Christian VI was forced to stay in the town due to bad weather on his journey to Norway.

In 1735 the town was described as a hamlet which supports itself on fishing and beaching of scows and some farming (fæstebønder).

Military history in 17th, 18th and 19th centuries
Due to its advantageous proximity to the entrance to the Baltic Sea, Frederikshavn has historically been a naval base of some strategic importance.

In 1627 under Kejserkrigen, Melchior von Hatzfeldt troops built a Sconce north of the fishing village. The sconce became known as Nordre Skanse and is preserved to this day. After the war this was manned by Danish troops. In 1675 the fortification was expanded with a sconse south of the harbour. Between 1686 and 1687 the fortification was expanded again with a heavy tower, a wall and a port. It was described as a citadel. The tower is known as Krudttårnet, (lit. "Gunpowder Tower"). In 1891 the wall and port was demolished, but the tower has been preserved. Krudttårnet is incorporated in the municipality's coat-of-arms.

During the Great Nordic War from 1700 to 1721 Peter Tordenskjold barricaded himself here in his fights against Sweden. In 1712 the Battle of Fladstrand was fought in the nearby sea between Swedish and Danish naval forces.

In 1735, 50 Danish men were stationed at the fortress. From the middle of the 18th century the military importance of the citadel was dwindling and some of the fortifications and building was disposed of. It gained new importance during the Gunboat War from 1807 to 1814, but its value diminished again after the war. The citadel was discontinued in 1864.

Market town 
During the Gunboat War, the town saw increasing trade and activity. The first artificial harbour was constructed from 1808 to 1810 due to the war and after several years of strong promotion of the local merchant Frantz Übersax.

Denmark's defeat in the war had a great impact in Fladstrand. The military left and the town largest source of income ceased. Denmark's general economic crisis worsened the situation. The town did not have status as a market town, but trade, craft and other activities exclusive to market towns had happened unlawful in Fladstrand for several decades anyway. A majority of the population had livelihoods based on crafts, services and trade, not production. This was used by the local civil servant as an argument for giving the town market town status. The harbour directorate argued that it was a strategic place for a harbour and giving the town market town status and legalising the current activities would help with the upkeep.

On 25 September 1818 Frederik VI bestowed the town status as a market town under the name of Frederikshavn.

From 1818

During the 1970s the ship yard wanted to expand with a dry dock at the location of Krudttårnet. Between 1974 and 1976 the engineering firm Kampsax and the local contractor Trigon encased the tower in concrete and moved it 270m along teflon rails to its current location. The project was delayed when a storm broke a retaining wall between Christmas and New Year 1975 filling the new dry dock with water and causing the base beneath the tower to collapse. The movement was celebrated 5. August 1976 with the visit from Margrethe II of Denmark and her family.

Stena Line operated a ferry service from Frederikshavn to Oslo, Norway from 1979 to March 14, 2020. It was served by three different ferries named Stena Saga. From 1979 to 1988 by former M/S Patricia built in 1967. From 1988 to 1994 by later MS Stena Europe. From 1994 to 2020 it was served by MS Stena Saga. It was first closed temporary due to the coronavirus pandemic. The decision to close it permanently was announced a few days later on March 19. The Oslo route was reopened by DFDS Seaways on June 25, 2020 by the ferries traveling to and from Copenhagen which began stopping in Frederikshavn. There is a single departure and arrival per day. The route is serviced by MS Pearl Seaways and MS Crown Seaways.

Economy

Companies in the area include MAN/BW Alpha and the Navy Base Frederikshavn (Flådestation Frederikshavn).

Frederikshavn, like the rest of North Jutland, was hit with hard unemployment.  The town's largest workplace, the shipyard Danyard, closed in the late 1990s.  This resulted in more than 2,000 workers being unemployed.  Today there is still activity at the large ship building area, with many small companies renting space there. In summer 2008, the unemployment rate, like the rest of Denmark, fell to a minimum low record of approximately 2%.

As with many provincial municipalities around the world, some of its young people leave to large urban cities. However, the municipality is currently engaged in many innovative projects which are attracting tourists and aim to retain population.

Frederikshavn is currently beginning a transition to make it the first medium-sized city/large town in the world to rely exclusively on renewable energy resources for power, including transportation and cars. The process is expected to be completed by 2030. As of 2010, the city was powered 18% by renewable energy.

Martin Professional had a large presence before its closure in 2016.

In culture
The  is used to denote a quality plaice. It is probably the most popular fish eaten in Denmark.

The drama television series Norskov (2015–2017) was filmed in and around Frederikshavn.

Attractions 

 Bangsbo Museum
 Frederikshavn Art Museum (Frederikshavn Kunstmuseum)
 Frederikshavn Shipyard Historical Society (Værftshistorisk Selskab Frederikshavn)
 Tordenskiold Festival, celebrated since 1998.
 Lighting Festival, biannual festival.
 Bangsbo Flower Festival
 Bangsbo Fort
 Bangsbo Botanical Garden

Sports
Frederikshavn White Hawks are the local professional ice hockey team playing in the premier Danish ice hockey league, Metal Ligaen.

Infrastructure

Transportation
 Three major roads connect Frederikshavn. E 45 connects to Aalborg in the south. Frederikshavn is the northern end of E 45 in Denmark. The route continues via the ferry in Gothenburg. Danish national road 35 connects Hjørring to the west. Danish national road 40 connects Skagen to the north. A secondary route connects to Brønderslev towards southwest.

Frederikshavn is served by Frederikshavn railway station. It is the terminal train station of the Vendsyssel and Skagen railway lines and offers direct InterCity services to Copenhagen, regional train services to Aalborg and local train services to Skagen.

Ferry service to Göteborg, in Sweden with StenaLine and Oslo, in Norway with DFDS. There is also a ferry service to the Island of Læsø

The nearest airport with scheduled national and international flights is Aalborg Airport 66 km away.

Port of Frederikshavn

Port of Frederikshavn is the largest harbour in Frederikshavn. It is a commercial port owned by Frederikshavn Municipality. It includes a ferry harbour, a cargo harbour and a large service industry. It has historically been dominated by the shipyard industry and fishing. Frederikshavn was in the late 19th century the dominant harbour for large fishing vessels in Denmark. The European shipyard industry was hit with difficulties in the 1980s and Danyard, the largest shipyard in Frederikshavn closed in December 1999. The municipality took over the harbour from the state in 2001. The site of the former Danyard was over the next 20 years transformed into a business park and the activity gradually went from manufacturing to service.

20152020 port expansion
In 2015 a large expansion of the port was started. The first of three phases was constructed from 2015 to 2018 by contractor Per Aarsleff. The official delivery from the contractor was on 8 June 2018. The officially inauguration coincided with the towns 200 year anniversary as a merchant town on 25 September 2018.
The expansion makes it possible to receive larger ships and offshore installations, handle more bulk material and a flexible area for projects. The first phase added 330.000 square metre hinterland and 600 metre of quay with a water depth 11 metre. Most of the quay and hinterland areas in the first phase have been leased by Louisiana-based Modern American Recycling Services for an 11-year period. In July 2018 they secured a contract to scrap the two platforms from Tyra Field. They are expected to begin the first recycling assignment in 2020 and create more than 200 jobs.
Construction of Scandinavia's largest bunkering terminal is underway on the new area. It will consists of 11 storage tanks with a combined capacity of 744000 m3. It is scheduled for completion by the end of 2020. It will be leased to Stena Oil. In November 2018 all the hinterland areas of the first phase have been leased. Five 2000 m2 large warehouses have been constructed on the new area.

The planning of the second stage of the expansion was started in June 2017. Construction started in October 2017. It is nearly completed as of December 2019. The second phase will add 170.000 square metre of hinterland and 400 metre of quay. The quay constructed in phase one will be deepened to 14 metres.

When the second phase is complete the total area of the harbour will be .

A further expansion in third phase is an option if there is demand.

Naval Base
South of the commercial port is Danish Navy Naval Harbour Frederikshavn. It is home to Danish navy 1st Squadron and Naval Operational Logistic Support Structure, OPLOG FRH. It is also the home location for the training ship Danmark and the royal yacht Dannebrog. It was home to the national icebreakers before their decommission in 2012.

The naval harbour was inaugurated on 2 October 1962.

Marinas
The also town has a number of smaller marinas (listed in order from north to south):
 Rønner Harbour (Rønnerhavn): pleasureboat, dinghy and fishing harbour
 Northern Entrenchment Harbour (Nordre Skanse Havn): dinghy harbour
 Frederikshavn Marina (Frederikshavn Marina): pleasureboat, dinghy and houseboat harbour 
 Neppen's Harbour (Neppens Havn): dinghy harbour

Education
EUC Nord - a technical school located partly in Frederikshavn.

Media
 Kanal Frederikshavn

Notable people

Christian Henrik Arendrup (1837–1913), Governor-General of The Danish West Indies 1881–1893
Karl Bovin (1907–1985), painter, key member the Odsherred Painters
Elsa Gress (1919–1988), essayist, novelist and dramatist
Allan Olsen (born 1956), pop musician
Henrik I. Christensen (born 1962), roboticist in San Diego, California
Connie Nielsen (born 1965), actress
Anja Ringgren Lovén (born 1978), protects children accused of being witches in Nigeria
Ditte Ejlerskov (born 1982), contemporary artist

Sport
Gustaf Nielsen (1910–1973), sports shooter
Harald Nielsen (1941–2015), footballer
Peter Møller (born 1972), footballer and sports journalist
Søren Frederiksen (born 1972) football player and manager
Lotte Kiærskou (born 1975), handballer, twice Olympic winner
Gitte Aaen (born 1981), handballer
Mads Christensen (born 1984), ice hockey player
Hans-Kristian Vittinghus (born 1986), badminton player
Lise Munk (born 1989), footballer
Lucas Bjerregaard (born 1991), golfer

Twin towns – sister cities
Frederikshavn practices twinning on the municipal level. For the twin towns, see twin towns of Frederikshavn Municipality.

Notes

References

External links

 Visit Frederikshavn, Official tourism site

 
Municipal seats of the North Jutland Region
Municipal seats of Denmark
Cities and towns in the North Jutland Region
Port cities and towns in Denmark
Port cities and towns of the North Sea
Frederikshavn Municipality

fo:Frederikshavn kommuna